Eric Barnes (29 November 1937 – 3 January 2014) was an English professional footballer who played for Crewe Alexandra between 1957 and 1970.

Barnes joined Crewe initially as an amateur while doing his National Service in the Royal Air Force. He played mainly as a centre half, but also had a spell at full back after Crewe signed Dave Ewing from Manchester City. He moved into non-league football with Witton Albion in 1970.

Honours
with Crewe Alexandra
Football League Fourth Division fourth-place promotion: 1967–68

References

1937 births
2014 deaths
People from Wythenshawe
English footballers
Association football defenders
Crewe Alexandra F.C. players
Witton Albion F.C. players
English Football League players